Honza málem králem is a 1976 Czechoslovak film. The film's cast includes Jiří Korn, Naďa Konvalinková, and Josef Kemr.

See also 
 Hloupý Honza

References

External links
 

1976 films
Czechoslovak fantasy films
1970s Czech-language films
Czech fantasy comedy films
Films based on fairy tales
1970s Czech films
Czechoslovak comedy films